Away from Her is a 2006 Canadian independent drama film written and directed by Sarah Polley and starring Julie Christie and Gordon Pinsent. Olympia Dukakis, Michael Murphy, Wendy Crewson, Alberta Watson, and Kristen Thomson are featured in supporting roles. The feature film directorial debut of Polley, it is based on Alice Munro's short story "The Bear Came Over the Mountain", from the 2001 collection Hateship, Friendship, Courtship, Loveship, Marriage.

The story centers on a couple whose marriage is tested when the wife begins to develop Alzheimer's and moves into a nursing home, where she loses virtually all memory of her husband and begins to develop a close relationship with another nursing home resident.

Away from Her premiered at the 2006 Toronto International Film Festival, Sundance Film Festival and the Berlin International Film Festival. It was theatrically released on May 4, 2007, and garnered critical acclaim, with critics praising Christie's performance and Polley's screenplay and direction. 
The film received two nominations at the 80th Academy Awards: Best Actress (for Christie) and Best Adapted Screenplay (for Polley). It also won seven Genie Awards, including Best Motion Picture.

Plot
Grant and Fiona are a retired married couple living in rural Brant County, Ontario. Fiona begins to lose her memory, and it becomes apparent she has Alzheimer's disease. Throughout the film, Grant's reflections on his marriage are woven with his reflections on his own infidelities, and influence his eventual decisions regarding Fiona's happiness.

When she feels she is becoming a risk to herself, Fiona decides to check into a nursing home, where one of the rules is that a patient cannot have any visitors for the first 30 days, in order to "adjust". Despite being wary of this policy, Grant agrees at the insistence of his wife whom he loves. During the drive to the home, Fiona acknowledges Grant's past infidelity while he was a university professor. Despite the awkward situation, the couple makes love one last time before separating.

When the 30-day period ends, Grant goes to visit his wife again, only to find she has forgotten him, and turned her affections to Aubrey, a mute man in a wheelchair who has become her "coping partner" in the facility.  A caregiver at the facility befriends Grant and gives him some advice and support.

While seeing his wife grow closer to Aubrey, Grant becomes an unhappy voyeur when visiting his wife at the nursing home. As time goes by and Fiona still does not remember him, Grant even wonders whether Fiona's dementia is an act, to punish him for his past indiscretions. After some time, Aubrey's wife Marian removes him from the home due to financial difficulties. This causes Fiona to sink into a deep depression, with her physical well-being also appearing to deteriorate. Grant is touched by this, and visits Marian in an effort to allow Fiona to see Aubrey again. He would rather see his wife happy with another man than miserable and alone. Marian initially refuses, but the meeting leads to a tentative relationship between her and Grant. As time passes, Grant continues to visit both Fiona and Marian. He eventually succeeds in taking Aubrey back to visit his wife. But in his "moment alone" before he brings Aubrey into Fiona's room, Fiona temporarily remembers him and the love she has for him. They embrace.

Cast

Production

Development

Sarah Polley read the short story "The Bear Came Over the Mountain" in The New Yorker when she was on a flight from working on Hal Hartley's No Such Thing in Iceland. Polley claimed to be impressed by Alice Munro's piece, saying "I found it so moving and poignant and it went so deep in me". She also envisioned her No Such Thing co-star Julie Christie as Fiona.

At that point of Polley's career, she had acted and had directed numerous short films, while the Munro adaptation would be her first feature film as director.  Although Polley said Christie liked the story, it was still challenging to persuade Christie to star given her desire to semi-retire, and she was secured after seven months of negotiation.

Atom Egoyan, who directed Polley in films such as The Sweet Hereafter, served as executive producer. He advised her on directing, telling her "the actor is the only person who is doing something genuinely magical on set- and that has to be protected at all costs".

Filming
Principal photography was underway in Ontario in February 2006, scheduled to take place to April 7. Most of the shooting occurred in Kitchener, Ontario, with some filming in Brant, Bracebridge, Paris, Ontario and Toronto.

For the nursing home scenes, Grand River Hospital (Freeport Site) in Kitchener, Ontario was used. The actors and 60 crew members spent two weeks on an unused second floor.

Release
The film premiered at the Toronto International Film Festival in September 2006. It was afterwards featured in the Sundance Film Festival and the Berlin International Film Festival.

In the United Kingdom, Away from Her opened on 27 April 2007. Distributed by Lions Gate Films, the film opened in New York City on 4 May 2007.  Mongrel Media and Capri Releasing released the film in Canada on 4 May. The DVD release of the film included Polley's 2001 short film I Shout Love as a bonus feature.

Reception

Box office
By 8 June 2007, Mongrel Media and Capri Releasing reported the film had grossed $1 million in Canada. It was the first English Canadian film to cross the $1 million threshold in Canada in 2007. It made an additional $2 million in the U.S.

The film finished its run on 19 July 2007 after grossing $4,571,521 in North America. It made $4,622,762 in other territories, for a worldwide total of $9,194,283.

Critical reception

The film received acclaim from critics. As of October 21, 2020, the review aggregator Rotten Tomatoes reported that 94% of critics gave the film positive reviews, based on 145 reviews, and an average rating of 8.12/10. The website's critical consensus states, "An accomplished directorial debut by Sarah Polley, Away From Her is a touching exploration of the effects of Alzheimer's, in which the tender wisdom of Polley's script is beautifully complemented by a wonderful performance from Julie Christie". Metacritic reported the film had an average score of 88 out of 100 signifying 'universal acclaim' based on 36 reviews. In Canada, the Toronto International Film Festival named it one of Top 10 Canadian films of the year. The Globe and Mail called it "heartbreaking" and "indelible". Geoff Pevere gave it three stars in The Toronto Star, saying Christie gave a wonderful performance and Pinsent was even better.

Roger Ebert awarded it four stars, calling the greatest of the films about Alzheimer's of the early 21st century, and "a heartbreaking masterpiece". Peter Bradshaw, writing in The Guardian, found the film smart and said this is possibly Christie's greatest performance. Dave Calhoun of Time Out said the film stood out for the idea that Fiona's Alzheimer's is punishment for Gordon's adulteries.

Variety Dennis Harvey complimented it for "a low-key, intelligent setting for performances marked by those same qualities", singling out Pinsent and Christie. Stella Papamichael, writing for BBC, gave it five stars, praising it as " a low-key yet powerful and uplifting story of love renewed", and said Christie's performance was memorable. Entertainment Weekly gave it a B, with Lisa Schwarzbaum writing Christie is "mesmerizing". The film appeared on many critics' top ten lists of the best films of 2007.

Accolades
Word about possible Academy Award recognition for Away from Her began at the Toronto International Film Festival, and critics associations particularly recognized Julie Christie for her performance. Lionsgate Films also chose to concentrate on promoting Christie in its Academy Award campaigning.

Criticism on the adaptation
 Agnès Berthin-Scaillet, A Reading of Away from Her, Sarah Polley's adaptation of Alice Munro's short story, The Bear Came Over the Mountain, in: Journal of the Short Story in English (JSSE)/Les cahiers de la nouvelle, ISSN 0294-0442, n° 55 (Autumn 2010).
 McGill, Robert, "No Nation but Adaptation: The Bear Came over the Mountain, Away from Her, and What It Means to Be Faithful", in: Canadian Literature/Littérature canadienne, 2008 Summer; 197: 98–111.

Other 

 Demetrios Matheou, "Not Remembering to Forget", in: Sight and Sound, 2007 May; 17 (5): 12. (Interview)
 Danny Munso, "Away from Her", in: Creative Screenwriting, 2007 Mar–Apr; 14 (2): 30.

Notes

References

External links

 Official Canadian site
 Official American site
 
 
 
 
 
 Away From Her at the Canadian Women Film Directors Database
 Away from Her announcement and press kit/pictures
 Ex-child star stirs Toronto in directorial debut from the Washington Post (subscription required)
 Lionsgate to bring Polley's Away from Her to theatres from CBC Arts
 Directing her first movie, the ever-precocious Sarah Polley finds magic in age-old love from Macleans magazine
 The Bear Came over the Mountain (short story, complete text)

2006 drama films
2006 films
Best First Feature Genie and Canadian Screen Award-winning films
Best Picture Genie and Canadian Screen Award winners
Canadian drama films
Canadian nonlinear narrative films
English-language Canadian films
Films about Alzheimer's disease
Films about old age
Films about couples
Films based on short fiction
Films based on works by Alice Munro
Films directed by Sarah Polley
Films featuring a Best Drama Actress Golden Globe-winning performance
Films set in psychiatric hospitals
Films shot in Hamilton, Ontario
Films shot in Toronto
Films with screenplays by Sarah Polley
HanWay Films films
Lionsgate films
2006 directorial debut films
Films set in Ontario
2000s English-language films
2000s Canadian films
Canadian independent films
2006 independent films
Films about disability